Gymnoscelis latipennis is a moth in the family Geometridae. It is found on Peninsular Malaysia and Borneo. The habitat consists of alluvial forest and lower montane forests.

References

Moths described in 1958
Gymnoscelis